The 1987 UC Santa Barbara Gauchos football team represented the University of California, Santa Barbara (UCSB) as an independent during the 1987 NCAA Division III football season. Led by second-year head coach Mike Warren, the Gauchos compiled a record of 8–2 and outscored their opponents 237 to 107 for the season. The team played home games at Harder Stadium in Santa Barbara, California.

Schedule

Notes

References

UC Santa Barbara
UC Santa Barbara Gauchos football seasons
UC Santa Barbara Gauchos football